Acromycter atlanticus is an eel in the family Congridae (conger/garden eels). It was described by David G. Smith in 1989. It is a marine, deep water-dwelling eel which is known from the western central Atlantic Ocean (from which its species epithet is derived). It dwells at a depth range of 503–640 meters. Males can reach a maximum total length of 29.5 centimeters.

References

Congridae
Fish described in 1989